Iain Donald Smith McLean (born 1983) is a Scottish international lawn bowler.

Bowls career
McLean won a bronze medal in the fours at the 2016 World Outdoor Bowls Championship in Christchurch with Alex Marshall, Paul Foster and Ronnie Duncan.

In 2013, he won the Hong Kong International Bowls Classic pairs title with Robert Grant and he also won the gold medal at the 2015 World Cup Singles in Warilla, New South Wales, Australia and in 2014 he became the World Singles Champion of Champions defeating Fairus Jabal of Malaysia in the final.

He is a two time winner of the Scottish National Bowls Championships in the singles.

In 2022, he competed in the men's singles and the men's triples at the 2022 Commonwealth Games.

References

Scottish male bowls players
1983 births
Living people
Bowls European Champions
Bowls players at the 2022 Commonwealth Games
Medallists at the 2022 Commonwealth Games
Commonwealth Games bronze medallists for Scotland
Commonwealth Games medallists in lawn bowls